Julie McDonald (born 2 April 1952) is an Australian former freestyle swimmer. She competed in two events at the 1968 Summer Olympics.

References

External links
 

1952 births
Living people
Australian female freestyle swimmers
Olympic swimmers of Australia
Swimmers at the 1968 Summer Olympics
Swimmers from Melbourne
20th-century Australian women